Denzil Dolley (born 22 July 1977 in Port Elizabeth, Eastern Cape) is a field hockey player from South Africa, who was a member of the national squad that finished tenth at the 2004 Summer Olympics in Athens. He played for the University of Port Elizabeth and a provincial team called KwaZulu Natal Raiders.  He has previously played for Holcombe Hockey Club - based in Rochester, Kent - in the UK National League, as well as coaching Sanderstead Hockey Club. He is now the 1st XI player/coach at Woking Hockey Club - based in Surrey.

International senior tournaments
 2001 – Champions Challenge, Kuala Lumpur (2nd)
 2002 – World Cup, Kuala Lumpur (13th)
 2002 – Commonwealth Games, Manchester (4th)
 2003 – All-Africa Games, Abuja (2nd)
 2004 – Summer Olympics, Athens (10th)
 2006 – World Cup, Mönchengladbach (12th)

References

External links

1977 births
Living people
South African male field hockey players
Olympic field hockey players of South Africa
South African field hockey coaches
Field hockey players at the 2002 Commonwealth Games
2002 Men's Hockey World Cup players
Field hockey players at the 2004 Summer Olympics
2006 Men's Hockey World Cup players
Sportspeople from Port Elizabeth
Commonwealth Games competitors for South Africa
Holcombe Hockey Club players
South African expatriate sportspeople in England
Expatriate field hockey players
African Games silver medalists for South Africa
Competitors at the 2003 All-Africa Games
African Games medalists in field hockey